The 1955 Bathurst 100 was a motor race held at the Mount Panorama Circuit near Bathurst in New South Wales, Australia on Monday, 11 April 1955.
It was contested on a handicap basis with the first car, the MG TC Special of Jack Carter starting 13 minutes before the last car, the Maserati of Reg Hunt.

The race was won on handicap by Curly Brydon driving an MG Special. Reg Hunt driving a Maserati set the fastest race time, thus winning the Scratch section.

Race classification

As there are known to have been 25 starters, the above listing is incomplete.

Notes
 Promoter: Australian Racing Drivers Club Ltd.
 Attendance: 35,000 
 Number of starters: 25 
 Number of finishers: Unknown
 Winner's average speed: 72.7 mph 
 Fastest time: Reg Hunt, 77 minutes 55 seconds

References

External links
 Bathurst Races Easter 1955, www.youtube.com

Motorsport in Bathurst, New South Wales
Bathurst 100
April 1955 sports events in Australia